Antitropical (alternatives include biantitropical or amphitropical) distribution is a type of disjunct distribution where a species or clade exists at comparable latitudes across the equator but not in the tropics. For example, a species may be found north of the Tropic of Cancer and south of the Tropic of Capricorn, but not in between. With increasing time since dispersal, the disjunct populations may be the same variety, species, or clade. How the life forms distribute themselves to the opposite hemisphere when they can't normally survive in the middle depends on the species; plants may have their seed spread through wind, animal, or other methods and then germinate upon reaching the appropriate climate, while sea life may be able to travel through the tropical regions in a larval state or by going through deep ocean currents with much colder temperatures than on the surface. For the American amphitropical distribution, dispersal has been generally agreed to be more likely than vicariance from a previous distribution including the tropics in North and South America.

Known cases

Plants
 Phacelia crenulata – scorpionweed
 Bowlesia incana – American Bowlesia
 Osmorhiza berteroi and Osmorhiza depauperata – sweet cecily species.
 Ruppia megacarpa
 Solenogyne
For a list of American amphitropically distributed plants (237 vascular plants), see the tables in the open access paper Simpson et al. 2017 or their working group on figshare

Animals
 Scylla serrata – mud crab
 Freshwater crayfish
 Ground beetle genus Bembidion

Bryophytes and lichens 

 Tetraplodon fuegianus - dung moss

See also
Rapoport's rule

References

Biogeography